Brian Dougans (born 1968) is a British musician, and a member of the British electronic duo, the Future Sound of London (FSOL).

He is the more technical member of FSOL, doing most of the programming, circuit bending et cetera and creating electronic instruments at his home studio in Glastonbury, Somerset. He is currently head of FSOLdigital (FSOL's record label) and co designer of the FSOL:Digitana SX-1 Synthesiser. 

Dougans' first releases were as "Humanoid", releasing the acid house single "Stakker Humanoid", which reached number 17 in the UK Singles Chart in 1988, and also charted in 1992 and 2001. "Stakker Humanoid" was No.1 for five weeks in the UK Dance Chart (December 1988) and has been cited as a major influence on early Aphex Twin releases. Dougans music as Humanoid is also part of the MOMA NY collection via Stakker Eurotechno. Dougans has always been the quiet, technical workhorse of FSOL whilst Garry Cobain brings in his melody and softness to balance Dougans' technical wizardry.

Music

Humanoid
Brian Dougans first releases were as "Humanoid", releasing the acid house single "Stakker Humanoid". The track was a hit not just at influential clubs like Shoom in London, but was championed by mainstream stalwarts like Radio DJ Bruno Brookes and Kylie and Jason producer Pete Waterman. After the single reached No. 17 in the UK Singles Chart in November 1988, leading to Dougans' appearance on Top of the Pops on 1 December 1988. Subsequent re-issues also charted in 1992 and 2001. 

Stakker Humanoid was No.1 for five weeks in the UK Dance Chart (December 1988) and has been cited as a major influence on early Aphex Twin releases. Dougans music as Humanoid is also part of the MOMA NY collection via Stakker Eurotechno.  

Stakker was also used as the name of the collaboration between Dougans and video artists Colin Scott and Mark McLean. Eurotechno, the soundtrack to a visual installation by the group, was originally released in 1989.

Future Sound of London
Dougans met Garry Cobain in 1985 when he was at Salford College of Technology in Manchester studying Music Recording Technology. After Dougans left college he set up his own studio in London where Cobain joined him and they began to release a plethora of singles under various aliases, some of which would end up on their first compilation album (as FSOL) Earthbeat in 1992.

Whereas the sound of Amorphous Androgynous is Cobain's vehicle, FSOL's more "mechanical" sound is Dougan's.

Synthesizers
Dougans has co-designed two synthesizers with English electronics company Digitana; the SX-1 analogue synthesizer and the Halia (stand alone digital sampler synth). The SX-1 has been received with critical acclaim and has been used in Spider-Man: Into the Spider-Verse, The Innocents and One Strange Rock.

Guinness World Records
Dougans received (along with his musical partner Cobain) three retrospective awards from the Guinness World Records.

Most notably, the first internet music download on 22 June 1994, distributed via the New York based internet bulletin board Sonicnet.
The first band to tour the world without leaving their studio
The first band to tour the world down telephone wires

Discography
All as Humanoid unless indicated (please see also The Future Sound of London).

Albums

Compilation albums

EPs

Singles

See also
 Rephlex Records discography

References

External links
 
 Humanoid biography and discography
 John Peel Session 1995

1968 births
Living people
Musicians from Glasgow
British dance musicians
British electronic musicians
New-age musicians
Intelligent dance musicians
Remixers
Breakbeat musicians
Braindance musicians